Lincoln Park Performing Arts Charter School is a public charter school located within Lincoln Park Performing Arts Center in Midland, Pennsylvania. It opened in 2006. The school provides grades 7th through 12th.  While it is a public school, students must apply, and audition to attend. The school is run by a seven-member board of trustees which appoints the school's administration.

The school year is 184 instructional days. The Midland Borough School District is the school's supervising district.

The school has eight "arts foci," or areas of study, including Dance, Writing And Publishing, Media Arts, Music, Vocal, Health Science and the Arts, Pre-Law And the Arts, Theatre, and Musical Theatre.

History 
Lincoln Park Performing Arts Center is built on the same plot as Midland's former Lincoln High School. After Lincoln High closed in 1987 due to low enrollment, the Midland area became increasingly depressed, and Midland Borough School District Town leaders initiated the construction of the Center, which houses the Lincoln Park Performing Arts Charter School.

In Spring of 2021, Lincoln Park briefly changed their name to “Peter Bernard School of Performing Arts” in memorial for the schools beloved teacher Peter Bernard after a petition initiated by students to honor the late teacher. While the name was later changed back to Lincoln Park in the Fall of 2022, it stands to show the deep care students and faculty have for one another.

Extracurriculars
The district offers a variety of clubs, activities and sports.Sports are part of the Western Pennsylvania Interscholastic Athletic League (Class A) and the Pennsylvania Interscholastic Athletic Association. The sports offered are: men's basketball, men's and women's golf and women's volleyball. Lincoln Park has won the WPIAL Men's Basketball championship in 2014, 2018, and 2019 (2018, 2019 in Class 3A).

The clubs/organization the school offers includes: Student Council, Environmental Club, National Honor Society, BatCat Press, The Siren, and Humanitarian Club.

References

Educational institutions established in 2006
Public high schools in Pennsylvania
Schools of the performing arts in the United States
Schools in Beaver County, Pennsylvania
Education in Pittsburgh area
Education in Beaver County, Pennsylvania
Charter schools in Pennsylvania
2006 establishments in Pennsylvania